Herbert Bracher (28 August 1886 – 25 February 1974) was an Australian cricketer. He played seven first-class cricket matches for Victoria between 1913 and 1922.

See also
 List of Victoria first-class cricketers

References

External links
 

1886 births
1974 deaths
Australian cricketers
Victoria cricketers
Cricketers from Melbourne